Elsebeth Mercedis Gunnleygsdóttur (born 26 October 1963) is a Faroese policewoman and politician of the conservative People's Party. She has been a member of Løgting since 2011.

Career
Gunnleygsdóttur worked for two years (1983-85) as an assistant at Postverk Føroya. She then began training with the police.

Politics
Gunnleygsdóttur has been sitting in the town council of her home town of Klaksvík since 2009. She also sat in various committees.

At the end of October 2011, she was elected to Løgting with 344 personal voices. She was chairman of the Judiciary Committee and was also a member of the Committee on Welfare.

In the elections to the Løgting on 1 September 2015 she was reelected with 371 personal votes. After Annika Olsen's resignation, she is the only female deputy not only in her faction, but in the entire opposition.

Personal life
Gunnleygsdóttur, who is daughter of Ellinor Maria and Gunnleyður Jakobsen is married to Finn Hansen. The couple have three children.

References

1963 births
Living people
Members of the Løgting
People's Party (Faroe Islands) politicians
Faroese women in politics
People from Klaksvík
21st-century Danish women politicians